Charaxes taverniersi is a butterfly in the family Nymphalidae. It is found in central Cameroon, Gabon and the Democratic Republic of the Congo. The habitat consists of forests.

References

External links
Images of C. taverniersi taverniersi Royal Museum for Central Africa (Albertine Rift Project)

Butterflies described in 1975
taverniersi